Tumor necrosis factor receptor type 1-associated DEATH domain protein is a protein that in humans is encoded by the TRADD gene.

TRADD is an adaptor protein.

Function 

The protein encoded by this gene is a death domain containing adaptor molecule that interacts with TNFRSF1A/TNFR1 and mediates programmed cell death signaling and NF-κB activation. This protein binds adaptor protein TRAF2, reduces the recruitment of inhibitor-of-apoptosis proteins (IAPs) by TRAF2, and thus suppresses TRAF2 mediated apoptosis. This protein can also interact with receptor TNFRSF6/FAS and adaptor protein FADD/MORT1, and is involved in the Fas-induced cell death pathway.

Interactions 

TRADD has been shown to interact with:

 FADD, 
 Keratin 18 
 RIPK1,
 STAT1, 
 TNFRSF1A, 
 TNFRSF25,  and
 TRAF2.

See also 
 TRAF
 RIP

References

Further reading

External links